Andrey Vladislavovich Smirnov (11 April 1957 – 16 October 2019) was a Soviet swimmer who competed in the 1976 Summer Olympics.

References

1957 births
2019 deaths
Soviet male freestyle swimmers
Soviet male medley swimmers
Olympic swimmers of the Soviet Union
Swimmers at the 1976 Summer Olympics
Olympic bronze medalists for the Soviet Union
Olympic bronze medalists in swimming
World Aquatics Championships medalists in swimming
European Aquatics Championships medalists in swimming
Medalists at the 1976 Summer Olympics
Swimmers from Saint Petersburg